Saint Philip AME Church in Atlanta, Georgia is the largest congregation in the Sixth Episcopal district of the African Methodist Episcopal Church with over 5,000 members.

History
Saint Philip AME Church began in 1875 on Renfroe St in Reynoldstown, a neighborhood in East Atlanta, under the leadership of Rev. Browning. A second edifice was erected on Oliver St (now known as Kenyon St). In 1922, another building was erected at the corner of Wylie St. & Selma St. This building still stands and is the home to another AME church.

In 1970, Rev. George A. Moore, Sr. became pastor at Saint Philip AME Church. In 1977, a group of trustees, under Pastor Moore's leadership, purchased a building at the corner of Candler Rd. & Memorial Dr. At this location, the church membership grew to over 10,000.

In 1998, also under the leadership of Pastor Moore, a new edifice was erected to accommodate 2,500 worshipers every Sunday at three services at 7:30am, 9:00 am & 11:00am. The former sanctuary at the corner of Candler Rd. & Memorial Dr. is still utilized by the church on various occasions.
 
In May 2011, after serving as senior pastor at Saint Philip for four decades, Rev. George A. Moore, Sr. was retired by the AME denomination and Rev. William D. Watley, PhD was appointed as the new minister.

Ministries
Class Leaders
Christian Education
Crown Financial Ministry
Lay Organization
Music & Arts
Missionary Society
Action Ministry
Young Adult Ministry
Career Resource Ministry

See also
Black Church

Religious organizations established in 1875
African Methodist Episcopal churches in Georgia (U.S. state)
History of Methodism in the United States
Methodist churches in Atlanta